Togo Shigekata (東郷 重位, 1560- 1643) was a direct student of Terasaka Yakuro Masatsune, the third headmaster of the Tenshinsho Jigen Ryu (自顕, Jigen), and of Marume Kurandonosuke Tessai, founder of the Taisha Ryu.Togo was a samurai from the Satsuma domain credited with founding the Jigen Ryu (示現, Jigen).

Biography

Togo Shigekata was born in 1560 in Satsuma, Japan (current day Kagoshima Prefecture). He had his first battlefield experience in 1577 at the Battle of Mimigawa when he was seventeen years old. In his twenties, Togo came under the tutelage of Marume Kurandonosuke Tessai, the founder the Taisha Ryu and quickly mastered the system where he was then initiated into the gokui (secrets) of the tradition.

In 1588, Togo accompanied Shimazu Yoshihiro (Lord of the Satsuma domain) to Kyoto where he met a Buddhist monk that went by the name of Zenkitsu. (Zenkitsu's given name was Terasaka Yakuro Masatsune) Zenkitsu was the chief priest of Tenneiji Temple and third headmaster of the Tenshisho Jigen Ryu. Under Zenkitsu's guidance, Togo mastered the Tenshinsho Jigen Ryu in less than a year.

Togo would return to Satsuma where he trained in the Tenshinsho Jigen Ryu for three years before combining his studies to create the Jigen Ryu.

Togo’s renaming of his school was based on an insight he gained by performing religious austerities (shugyo). While meditating on a section of the Lotus Sutra, Shigekata became inspired by the phrase “jigen jintsuriki” (示現神通力, a sudden revelation of divine power). He therefore changed the characters of Jigen Ryu from jigen (自顕, self-power revelation) to a set of characters from the Buddhist text- jigen (示現, sudden revelation). In this sense, jigen indicates the use by a buddha of a “manifest form” in order to teach sentient beings.

At the age of 44, Togo became the chief swordsmanship instructor for the Satsuma domain.

Togo died in 1643.

References

Japanese martial artists
Japanese swordfighters
Samurai